The Rugby-Bundesliga 2008-09 was the 38th edition of this competition and the 89th edition of the German rugby union championship. Nine teams play a home-and-away season with a finals round between the top four teams at the end. The bottom two teams determine which club is relegated in an end-of-season decider. The season started on 30 August 2008 and finished with the championship final on 23 May 2009, interrupted by a winter break from early December to late February.

The competition was won by the SC Frankfurt 1880 the previous season.

Overview
The 2008-09 modus was somewhat different from the previous season. The competition had been expanded from eight to nine teams. The final, which used to be determined by the top-two teams of the regular season was now played by the two winners of the semi-finals which pair the first placed team against the fourth and the second against the third.

At the bottom end of the table, a relegation match between the two last-placed teams was also a new introduction. All up, the number of season games in the Rugby-Bundesliga increased to 76 from 57.

This change of modus was decided upon on 19 July 2008 at the annual general meeting of the German rugby association, the DRV. It was decided to expand the league to ten teams for 2009-10, meaning only one club was to be relegated in 2009, and two promoted. It was also then decided to introduce the extended play-off format.

The defending champion was SC 1880 Frankfurt, who beat RG Heidelberg in the 2007-08 final, while the RK 03 Berlin was newly promoted to the league.

With Kerstin Ljungdahl and Dana Teagarden, two female head referees have been officiating in the Rugby-Bundesliga in 2008-09.

Bundesliga table

Relegated: DRC Hannover
Promoted: ASV Köln Rugby and DSV 78 Hannover

Player statistics

Try scorers
The leading try scores in the Rugby-Bundesliga 2008–09 season were (10 tries or more):

Point scorers
The leading point scores in the Rugby-Bundesliga 2008–09 season were (100 points or more):

Per club
The top try and point scorers per club were:

Bundesliga results

Key

Promotion/relegation play-off

Relegation match

 The DRC Hannover canceled the game on 18 April 2009 and voluntarily accepted relegation to the 2nd Bundesliga North/East.

Semi-finals and final

Semi-finals

Final

Squads

2nd Bundesliga tables

South/West

Promoted to Bundesliga: ASV Köln Rugby (SC 1880 Frankfurt II inelegible)
Relegated from Bundesliga: none
Relegated from 2nd Bundesliga: SG Heidelberger TV/SC Neuenheim II 
Promoted to 2nd Bundesliga: RC Luxembourg, Karlsruher SV Rugby
 ‡ Two points deducted for break of licensing agreement; insufficient numbers of youth teams.

North/East

Promoted to Bundesliga: DSV 78/08 Ricklingen
Relegated from Bundesliga: DRC Hannover
Relegated from 2nd Bundesliga: SG Schwalbe/DRC Hannover II, Berliner SV 92 Rugby
Promoted to 2nd Bundesliga: Berliner RC II, FT Adler Kiel Rugby
 ‡  Team withdrawn from the competition on 22 April 2009 due to a lack of players.

2nd Bundesliga final

DRV-Pokal 2008-09
In 2008-09, 16 teams took part in the national cup competition, those being the eight clubs who played in the Bundesliga in 2007-08 plus the top-four of each of the two 2nd Bundesligas that season.

Source:
 1 Game not played, awarded to DRC Hannover.
 2 Game awarded to Frankfurt after Hannover cancelled the game, stating that they were unable to compete at the scheduled date and no other date being available.

References

External links
 rugbyweb.de - Rugby-Bundesliga table & results  
 Rugby-Journal - Bundesliga table & results  
 Totalrugby.de - Bundesliga table & results 

 
2008-09
2008–09 in German rugby union
Germany